Wurmbea inframediana is a species of plant in the Colchicaceae family that is endemic to Australia.

Description
The species is a cormous perennial herb that grows to a height of 2.5–12 cm. Its pink flowers appear from June to August.

Distribution and habitat
The species is found in the Carnarvon, Gascoyne, Geraldton Sandplains, Murchison and Yalgoo IBRA bioregions of western Western Australia. It grows in red sand, loam and limestone soils.

References

inframediana
Monocots of Australia
Angiosperms of Western Australia
Plants described in 1980
Taxa named by Terry Desmond Macfarlane